Bahawalpur Cantonment is a cantonment adjacent to Bahawalpur in Punjab province, Pakistan. 

It was established in 1968 and has an army unit of 30,000 troops. It also is the headquarters of Pakistan Army's 31 Corps.

References

External links
Bahawalpur Cantonment Board official website

Cantonments of Pakistan
Bahawalpur